Kvasha is a traditional Ukrainian dish similar to kissel. It is also a gender-neutral Ukrainian surname that may refer to
Alona Kvasha (born 1984), Ukrainian artistic gymnast
Igor Kvasha (1933–2012), Soviet and Russian theater and film actor
Illya Kvasha (born 1988), Ukrainian 
Oleg Kvasha (born 1978), Russian ice hockey forward

See also
 

Ukrainian-language surnames